Pichette is a surname of French origin. People with that name include:

 Dave Pichette (born 1960), Canadian ice hockey player
 Henri Pichette (1924–2000), French writer and poet
 J. Roger Pichette (1921-2002), Canadian politician
 Jean-François Pichette (born 1962), Canadian Francophone actor from Quebec
 Patrick Pichette (born before 1987), Canadian business executive, formerly with Google Inc
 Pierre Pichette (born 1954), Canadian ice sledge hockey player who competed in the 1994, 1998 and 2002 Winter Paralympics

See also 
 :fr:Pichette, a disambiguation page in French Wikipedia
 

Surnames of French origin